Vassilis Toliopoulos (alternative spelling: Vasilis, Vasileios) (Greek: Βασίλης Τολιόπουλος; born 15 June 1996) is a Greek professional basketball player for Aris of the Greek Basket League. He is a 1.88 m (6 ft 2 in) tall combo guard.

Youth career
Toliopoulos played from a young age with the youth teams of Panionios, before he started his pro career with Ikaros Chalkidas.

Professional career
Toliopoulos began his professional career with the Greek League club Ikaros Chalkidas, during the 2013–14 season.

In 2014, he moved to Kolossos Rodou.

In the summer of 2015, he joined the Greek EuroLeague club Olympiacos, when he signed a 4-year contract with the club.

He moved to Aris Thessaloniki in early 2019. On 4 July 2019 he signed a four-year contract with AEK Athens. 

On 31 August 2020 Toliopoulos was loaned to Ionikos Nikaias for the 2020–21 season. He averaged 11.6 points and 3.5 assists per game in the Greek Basket League with Ionikos.

On 29 June 2021 Toliopoulos signed a two-year (1+1) contract with PAOK Thessaloniki. In 23 league games, he averaged 6.3 points, 1.8 rebounds and 2 assists, playing around 15 minutes per contest. Additionally, in 8 BCL games, he averaged 8.3 points and 3.3 assists. On July 1, 2022, the club opted out of their mutual contract and Toliopoulos became a free agent.

On 6 July 2022, Toliopoulos returned to Aris.

National team career
Toliopoulos played at the 2012 FIBA Europe Under-16 Championship, the 2013 FIBA Europe Under-18 Championship, and the 2014 FIBA Europe Under-18 Championship with the junior national teams of Greece. He also played at the 2015 FIBA Under-19 World Cup, and the 2nd division 2016 FIBA Europe Under-20 Championship Division B, where he won a bronze medal.

Career statistics

EuroLeague

|-
| style="text-align:left;"| 2015–16
| style="text-align:left;"| Olympiacos
| 1 || 0 || 1 || 0 || 0 || 1.000 || 0 || 0 || 0 || 0 || 2 || 3
|-
| style="text-align:left;"| 2016–17
| style="text-align:left;"| Olympiacos
| 4 || 0 || 0.6 || .250 || .333 || 0 || 0 || 0 || 0 || 0 || 0.8 || -0.5
|-
| style="text-align:left;"| 2017–18
| style="text-align:left;"| Olympiacos
| 10 || 0 || 5.3 || .294 || .308 || .500 || 0.3 ||  0.9 || 0.2 || 0.1 || 1.5 || 1.2
|- class="sortbottom"
| style="text-align:left;"| Career
| style="text-align:left;"|
| 15 || 0 || 3.8 || .289 || .313 || .750 || 0.2 || 0.6 || 0.1 || 0.1 || 1.3 || 0.9

Domestic Leagues

Regular season

|-
| 2018–19
| style="text-align:left;"| Olympiacos
| align=center | GBL
| 5 || 4.0 || .375 || .167 || - || .2 || .6 || 0 || 0 || 1.4
|-
| 2018–19
| style="text-align:left;"| Aris
| align=center | GBL
| 15 || 19.0 || .358 || .342 || .722 || 1.5 || 1.5 || .5 || 0 || 7.7
|}

Awards and accomplishments

Pro career
Greek League Champion: (2016)

Greek junior national team
2016 FIBA Europe Under-20 Championship Division B:

References

External links
 Vassilis Toliopoulos at basket.gr 
 Vassilis Toliopoulos at eurobasket.com
 Vassilis Toliopoulos at euroleague.net
 Vassilis Toliopoulos at esake.gr 
 Vassilis Toliopoulos at fiba.com
 Vassilis Toliopoulos at fibaeurope.com

1996 births
Living people
AEK B.C. players
Aris B.C. players
Basketball players from Athens
Greek men's basketball players
Ikaros B.C. players
Ionikos Nikaias B.C. players
Kolossos Rodou B.C. players
Olympiacos B.C. players
P.A.O.K. BC players
Point guards
Shooting guards